Lucky Orimisan Aiyedatiwa (born 12 January 1965) is a Nigerian businessman and politician who has served as deputy governor of Ondo State since 2021 succeeding Agboola Ajayi.  He is a former commissioner of Niger Delta Development Commission (NDDC).

Early life 
Aiyedatiwa was born on 12 January 1965, he hails from Obe-Nla, an oil-bearing community in Ilaje Local Government Area of Ondo State.

Background 
Lucky had his Primary education at Saint Peter's UNA (now FAC) Primary School, Obe Nla/Obe Adun in Ilaje LGA of Ondo State between 1970 and 1976. He had his secondary education at Ikosi High School, Ketu, Lagos, in 1982. In 1986, he obtained Nigeria Certificate in Education (NCE) in Economics and Government from Lagos State College of Education (now Adeniran Ogunsanya College of Education), Ijanikin, Lagos, he later attended University of Ibadan for Advanced Diploma in Business Administration in the year 2001. He became an alumnus of Lagos Business School – Pan Atlantic University, Lekki, Lagos where he obtained Post Graduate Certification in Chief Executive Education (CEP) in Business Management in 2009. In 2013, he obtained a Master's Degree in Business Administration (MBA) from University of Liverpool, United Kingdom.

Career 
He worked as an Inventory/Store Officer at Scoa Assembly Plant Plc. Apapa, Lagos, between 1982 and 1983. In 1987 he was Assistant Head Teacher at Reliance International Schools, Ijokodo, Ibadan. He became Marketing Officer at Universal Pharmaceutical Supply Co. Ltd, Ikeja, Lagos in the year 1990. In 1992, he was an Assistant Investment Analyst. Global Trust Limited, Gbagada, Lagos, he was General Merchandise Manager, Biz Mart Nigeria Limited, Lagos Island, Lagos, 1994.

He is the MD/CEO of Blue Wall Group of Companies which he established in 1996 which includes; Blue Wall Nigeria Ltd, a Trading Company, Blue Wall BDC Nigeria Ltd, a Central Bank of Nigeria (CBN) licensed foreign exchange trading company and Blue Wall Safety Travels and Tours, an IATA licensed Travel Agency and Logistic Company.

Early political career 
He joined active politics in 2011 as a card-carrying member of the Action Congress of Nigeria (ACN) which later merged with other political parties and became All Progressive Congress (APC). He was one of the National Delegates from Ondo State at the All Progressive Congress (APC) National Convention at Abuja in 2014. He contested for the federal House of Representative for Ilaje/Ese-Odo Federal Constituency in 2015 Presidential and National Assembly General Election.

Later roles and Appointment 
He was appointed Federal Commissioner who represented Ondo State on the Board of Niger Delta Development Commission (NDDC), 2018–2019.

He is presently the running mate of the Governor of Ondo State Arakunrin Rotimi Akeredolu for 10 October 2020 governorship election.

He was presented to the national party leader of All Progressive Congress Asiwaju Bola Tinubu by Arakunrin Rotimi.

Deputy Governor 
On Sunday 11 October 2020, Akeredolu and Aiyedatiwa were re-elected Governor and deputy governor of Ondo State as announced by the Independent National Electoral Commission.

On 25 February 2021, Akeredolu and Aiyedatiwa were sworn into office as Governor and Deputy Governor of Ondo State respectively.

References 

Living people
People from Ondo State
1965 births
All Progressives Congress politicians